The International Commission on Trichinellosis is an international organization founded in 1958 in Budapest. It aims to exchange information on the biology, physiopathology, epidemiology, immunology, and clinical aspects of trichinellosis in humans and animals.

International Conferences on Trichinellosis 
The International Commission on Trichinellosis is the initiator and participant in organization of the International Conferences on Trichinellosis. Since its creation, members (more than 110 from 46 countries) have regularly gathered and worked together during meetings held every 4 years: the International Conferences on Trichinellosis.

References

External links 
International Commission on Trichinellosis

Parasitology research